Men's water polo has been part of the Summer Olympics program since 1900. Hungary men's national water polo team has won sixteen Olympic medals, becoming the most successful country in men's tournament.

There are fifty-nine male athletes who have won three or more Olympic medals in water polo. Dezső Gyarmati of Hungary is the only athlete of either gender to win five Olympic medals in water polo.

Abbreviations

Medalists by tournament

Overall multiple medalists
As of the 2020 Summer Olympics, 59 male athletes have won three or more Olympic medals in water polo.

By tournament
The following table is pre-sorted by edition of the Olympics (in ascending order), name of the team (in ascending order), name of the player (in ascending order), respectively. Last updated: 11 August 2021.

Legend
 Team* – Host team

Sources:
 Sports Reference: Athlete Medal Leaders (1900–2016);
 Official Results Books (PDF): 2000 (p. 27), 2004 (p. 89), 2008 (p. 79), 2012 (p. 370), 2016 (p. 6), 2020 (p. 11).

By confederation
Last updated: 11 August 2021.

By team
Last updated: 11 August 2021.

Legend
 Team† – Defunct team

By position
Last updated: 11 August 2021.

Four or more Olympic medals

Three Olympic medals
The following table is pre-sorted by number of Olympic gold medals (in descending order), number of Olympic silver medals (in descending order), year of receiving the last Olympic medal (in ascending order), year of receiving the first Olympic medal (in ascending order), name of the player (in ascending order), respectively. Last updated: 11 August 2021.

Forty-eight male athletes won three Olympic medals in water polo.

Legend
  – Hosts

Sources:
 Sports Reference: Athlete Medal Leaders (1900–2016);
 Official Results Books (PDF): 2000 (p. 27), 2004 (p. 89), 2008 (p. 79), 2012 (p. 370), 2016 (p. 6), 2020 (p. 11).

Multiple medalists by team
The following tables are pre-sorted by total number of Olympic medals (in descending order), number of Olympic gold medals (in descending order), number of Olympic silver medals (in descending order), year of receiving the last Olympic medal (in ascending order), year of receiving the first Olympic medal (in ascending order), name of the player (in ascending order), respectively.

Legend
 Year* – As host team
 Team† – Defunct team

Belgium
 Men's national team: 
 Team appearances: 11 (1900, 1908–1928, 1936–1952, 1960–1964)
 As host team: 1920*
* Number of five-time Olympic medalists: 0
 Number of four-time Olympic medalists: 1
 Number of three-time Olympic medalists: 3
 Last updated: 1 May 2021.

Legend
  – Hosts

Croatia
 Men's national team: 
 Team appearances: 7 (1996–2020)
 As host team: —
 Related team: Yugoslavia†
* Number of four-time Olympic medalists: 0
 Number of three-time Olympic medalists: 1
 Last updated: 1 May 2021.

Abbreviation
 CRO – Croatia
 YUG – Yugoslavia

France
 Men's national team: 
 Team appearances: 11 (1900*, 1912–1928, 1936–1948, 1960, 1988–1992, 2016)
 As host team: 1900*, 1924*
* Number of four-time Olympic medalists: 0
 Number of three-time Olympic medalists: 0
 Last updated: 1 May 2021.

Germany
 Men's national team: 
 Team appearances: 9 (1900, 1928–1936*, 1952, 1992–1996, 2004–2008)
 As host team: 1936*
 Related team: West Germany†
* Number of four-time Olympic medalists: 0
 Number of three-time Olympic medalists: 1
 Last updated: 1 May 2021.

Legend
  – Hosts

Great Britain
 Men's national team: 
 Team appearances: 11 (1900, 1908*–1928, 1936–1956, 2012*)
 As host team: 1908*, 1948*, 2012*
* Number of four-time Olympic medalists: 0
 Number of three-time Olympic medalists: 2
 Last updated: 1 May 2021.

Legend
  – Hosts

Greece
 Men's national team: 
 Team appearances: 16 (1920–1924, 1948, 1968–1972, 1980–2020)
 As host team: 2004*
* Number of four-time Olympic medalists: 0
 Number of three-time Olympic medalists: 0
 Last updated: 11 August 2021.

Hungary
 Men's national team: 
 Team appearances: 23 (1912, 1924–1980, 1988–2020)
 As host team: —
* Number of five-time Olympic medalists: 1
 Number of four-time Olympic medalists: 6
 Number of three-time Olympic medalists: 19
 Last updated: 11 August 2021.

Italy
 Men's national team: 
 Team appearances: 21 (1920–1924, 1948–2020)
 As host team: 1960*
* Number of four-time Olympic medalists: 0
 Number of three-time Olympic medalists: 0
 Last updated: 1 May 2021.

Netherlands
 Men's national team: 
 Team appearances: 17 (1908, 1920–1928*, 1936–1952, 1960–1984, 1992–2000)
 As host team: 1928*
* Number of four-time Olympic medalists: 0
 Number of three-time Olympic medalists: 0
 Last updated: 1 May 2021.

Russia
 Men's national team: 
 Team appearances: 3 (1996–2004)
 As host team: —
 Related teams: Soviet Union†, Unified Team†
* Number of four-time Olympic medalists: 0
 Number of three-time Olympic medalists: 2
 Last updated: 1 May 2021.

Abbreviation
 EUN – Unified Team
 RUS – Russia

Serbia
 Men's national team: 
 Team appearances: 4 (2008–2020)
 As host team: —
 Related teams: Yugoslavia†, FR Yugoslavia†, Serbia and Montenegro†
* Number of four-time Olympic medalists: 3
 Number of three-time Olympic medalists: 11
 Last updated: 11 August 2021.

Abbreviation
 FRY – FR Yugoslavia
 SCG – Serbia and Montenegro
 SRB – Serbia

Serbia and Montenegro
 Men's national team: †
 Team appearances: 1 (2004)
 As host team: —
 Related teams: Yugoslavia†, FR Yugoslavia†, Montenegro, Serbia
 Number of five-time Olympic medalists: 0
 Number of four-time Olympic medalists: 0
 Number of three-time Olympic medalists: 0
 Last updated: 1 May 2021.

Notes:
 Aleksandar Ćirić is listed in section Serbia.
 Slobodan Nikić is listed in section Serbia.
 Aleksandar Šapić is listed in section Serbia.
 Dejan Savić is listed in section Serbia.
 Vanja Udovičić is listed in section Serbia.
 Vladimir Vujasinović is listed in section Serbia.

Soviet Union
 Men's national team: †
 Team appearances: 9 (1952–1980*, 1988)
 As host team: 1980*
 Related teams: Unified Team†, Russia
 Number of four-time Olympic medalists: 0
 Number of three-time Olympic medalists: 4
 Last updated: 1 May 2021.

Legend
  – Hosts

Note:
 Yevgeny Sharonov is listed in section Unified Team.

Spain
 Men's national team: 
 Team appearances: 18 (1920–1928, 1948–1952, 1968–1972, 1980–2020)
 As host team: 1992*
* Number of four-time Olympic medalists: 0
 Number of three-time Olympic medalists: 0
 Last updated: 1 May 2021.

Sweden
 Men's national team: 
 Team appearances: 8 (1908–1924, 1936–1952, 1980)
 As host team: 1912*
* Number of four-time Olympic medalists: 0
 Number of three-time Olympic medalists: 4
 Last updated: 1 May 2021.

Legend
  – Hosts

Unified Team
 Men's national team:  Unified Team†
 Team appearances: 1 (1992)
 As host team: —
 Related teams: Soviet Union†, Russia
 Number of four-time Olympic medalists: 0
 Number of three-time Olympic medalists: 1
 Last updated: 1 May 2021.

Legend and abbreviation
  – Hosts
 EUN – Unified Team
 URS – Soviet Union

Notes:
 Dmitry Gorshkov is listed in section Russia.
 Nikolay Kozlov is listed in section Russia.

United States
 Men's national team: 
 Team appearances: 22 (1920–1972, 1984*–2020)
 As host team: 1932*, 1984*, 1996*
* Number of four-time Olympic medalists: 0
 Number of three-time Olympic medalists: 0
 Last updated: 1 May 2021.

West Germany
 Men's national team: †
 Team appearances: 5 (1968–1976, 1984–1988)
 As host team: 1972*
 Related teams: Germany
 Number of four-time Olympic medalists: 0
 Number of three-time Olympic medalists: 0
 Last updated: 1 May 2021.

Yugoslavia
 Men's national team: †
 Team appearances: 12 (1936–1988)
 As host team: —
 Related teams: Croatia, FR Yugoslavia†, Serbia and Montenegro†, Montenegro, Serbia
* Number of four-time Olympic medalists: 0
 Number of three-time Olympic medalists: 0
 Last updated: 1 May 2021.

Note:
 Perica Bukić is listed in section Croatia.

FR Yugoslavia
 Men's national team: †
 Team appearances: 2 (1996–2000)
 As host team: —
 Related teams: Yugoslavia†, Serbia and Montenegro†, Montenegro, Serbia
 Number of four-time Olympic medalists: 0
 Number of three-time Olympic medalists: 0
 Last updated: 1 May 2021.

Notes:
 Aleksandar Ćirić is listed in section Serbia.
 Aleksandar Šapić is listed in section Serbia.
 Dejan Savić is listed in section Serbia.
 Vladimir Vujasinović is listed in section Serbia.

See also
 Water polo at the Summer Olympics

 Lists of Olympic water polo records and statistics
 List of men's Olympic water polo tournament records and statistics
 List of women's Olympic water polo tournament records and statistics
 List of Olympic champions in men's water polo
 List of Olympic champions in women's water polo
 National team appearances in the men's Olympic water polo tournament
 National team appearances in the women's Olympic water polo tournament
 List of players who have appeared in multiple men's Olympic water polo tournaments
 List of players who have appeared in multiple women's Olympic water polo tournaments
 List of Olympic medalists in water polo (women)
 List of men's Olympic water polo tournament top goalscorers
 List of women's Olympic water polo tournament top goalscorers
 List of men's Olympic water polo tournament goalkeepers
 List of women's Olympic water polo tournament goalkeepers
 List of Olympic venues in water polo

 List of World Aquatics Championships medalists in water polo

Notes

References

Sources

External links
 Olympic water polo – Official website

 Men
Medalists, Men
Olympics, Men
Water polo, Men
Water polo